The Olin Consolidated Community School District is a public school district headquartered in Olin, Iowa.  The district is completely within Jones County and serves the town of Olin and the surrounding rural areas.

As of 2019, Dave Larson serves as shared superintendent of Olin, Bennett, and Wapsie Valley.

Schools
The district operates a single elementary school in Olin:
 Olin Elementary School

Students from Olin attend secondary school at Anamosa.

References

External links
 Olin Consolidated Community School District

School districts in Iowa
Education in Jones County, Iowa